David Zeisberger (April 11, 1721 – November 17, 1808) was a Moravian clergyman and missionary among the Native American tribes who resided in the Thirteen Colonies. He established communities of Munsee (Lenape) converts to Christianity in the valley of the Muskingum River in Ohio; and for a time, near modern-day Amherstburg, Ontario.

Biography
Zeisberger was born in Zauchtenthal, Moravia (present day Suchdol nad Odrou in the Czech Republic) and moved with his family to the newly established Moravian Christian community of Herrnhut, on the estate of Count Nicolaus Ludwig von Zinzendorf in the German Electorate of Saxony in 1727. However, when his family migrated to the newly established colony of Georgia, Zeisberger remained in Europe to complete his education. In 1738, he came to Georgia in the Thirteen Colonies, with the assistance of governor of Georgia James Edward Oglethorpe. He later rejoined his family in the Moravian community at Savannah, Georgia. At the time, the United Brethren had begun a settlement, merely for the purpose of preaching the gospel to the Creek Indians. From there he moved to Pennsylvania, and assisted at the commencement of the settlements of Nazareth and Bethlehem.

In 1739, Zeisberger was influential in the development of a Moravian community in Bethlehem, Pennsylvania, and was there at its dedication on Christmas Eve 1741. Four years later, at the invitation of Hendrick Theyanoguin, he came to live among the Mohawk. He became fluent in the Onondaga language and assisted Conrad Weiser in negotiating an alliance between the Thirteen Colonies and the Iroquois in Onondaga (near present-day Syracuse, New York). Zeisberger also produced dictionaries and religious works in Iroquoian and Algonquian, making him the father of Lenape writing 

Zeisberger began as a missionary to Native American peoples following his ordination as a Moravian minister in 1749. He worked in Kuskusky among the Lenape (Delaware) of Pennsylvania, focusing his efforts on converting as many Indians as possible to Christianity. He was the senior missionary of the United Brethren (as the Moravians sometimes referred to themselves) among the Indians. His relations with the British took a turn for the worse during the American Revolutionary War (as they suspected he was providing aid to the American patriots, and in 1781 he was arrested and detained at Fort Detroit. While he was detained, ninety-six of his Native converts in Gnadenhutten, Ohio were brutally murdered by Pennsylvania militiamen, an event known as the Gnadenhutten Massacre.

After Zeisberger was released, violent conflicts with other Native tribes and the expansion of white settlement forced many Moravian Christian settlements to relocate to present-day Michigan and Ontario. A large group of Munsee moved there in 1782, but Zeisberger later returned to live the rest of his life among the Native converts remaining near the village of Goshen (in present Goshen Township, Tuscarawas County, Ohio). Zeisberger spent a period of 62 years, excepting a few short intervals, as a missionary among the Indians. He died on November 17, 1808 at Goshen, Ohio, on the river Tuscarawas, at the age of 87 years. Zeisberger is buried in Goshen.

Notes

References
 American Eagle Newspaper, February 15, 1809; Vol 2: Page 3: Cumberland, Maryland
 Earl P. Olmstead. Blackcoats Among the Delaware. .
 Earl P. Olmstead. David Zeisberger: A Life Among the Indians. ).
 William Henry Rice. David Zeisberger and His Brown Brethren.
 David Zeisberger, Archer Butler Hulbert. David Zeisberger's History of Northern American Indians.
 David Zeisberger. Diary of David Zeisberger.
 Gail Hamlin-Wilson, Nancy K. Capace, Donald B. Ricky. Encyclopedia of Ohio Indians. ).
 David Zeisberger. Essay of an Onondaga Grammar.
 James H. O'Donnell. Ohio's First Peoples. ).
 Beverley Waugh Bond. The Foundations of Ohio.
 Daniel P. Barr. The Boundaries Between Us: Natives and Newcomers Along the Frontiers of the Old Northwest Territory. ).
 Samuel Lieberkühn, David Zeisberger, The History of our Lord and Saviour Jesus Christ
 Edmund De Schweinitz. The Life and Times of David Zeisberger.
 R. Douglas Hurt. The Ohio Frontier: Crucible of the Old Northwest. .
 David Zeisberger. Zeisberger's Indian Dictionary.

External links
Short Biography at the Ohio Historical Society
David Zeisberger Historical Mile Marker in Pennsylvania
Scenes from the Life of David Zeisberger Free pdf biographical sketch

1721 births
1808 deaths
Moravian Church missionaries
German people of the Moravian Church
American people of the Moravian Church
American sermon writers
18th-century Protestant religious leaders
German Protestant missionaries
American Protestant missionaries
American evangelicals
German evangelicals
Protestant missionaries in the United States
Protestant missionaries in Canada
People of Michigan in the American Revolution
Clergy in the American Revolution
American people of Moravian-German descent
Czech expatriates in the United States
People from Suchdol nad Odrou
Pre-Confederation Ontario people
Burials in Ohio
Clergy of the Moravian Church